Let It Ripp is The Rippingtons' 12th album, released in 2003.

Track listing
All songs composed by Russ Freeman.
"Let It Ripp" - 5:09
"Mr. 3" - 4:31
"Lucky Charm" - 5:15
"A Private Getaway" - 4:27
"High Life" - 5:15
"Avalon" - 4:04
"Bella Luna" - 3:56
"Stingray" - 4:44
"17 Mile Drive" -  4:12
"Cast a Spell" - 4:22
"Get Over It" - 4:23

Personnel 

 Russ Freeman – keyboards, guitars, guitar synthesizer, arrangements
 Bill Heller – keyboards 
 Kim Stone – bass
 Dave Karasony – drums
 Scott Breadman – percussion 
 Eric Marienthal – saxophones 
 Steven Holtman – trombone (1, 2, 5, 8, 9)
 Gary Grant – trumpet (1, 2, 5, 8, 9)
 Jerry Hey – trumpet (1, 2, 5, 8, 9)

Production
 Producer and Engineer – Russ Freeman 
 Executive Producers – Russ Freeman and Andi Howard
 Additional Engineer – Marko Ruffalo
 Mixing – Nick Sodano 
 Mastered by Robert Hadley and Doug Sax 
 A&R Coordination – Valerie Ince
 Production Coordinator – Leilani Shelby
 Art Direction, Design and Photography – Sonny Mediana 
 Management – Andi Howard Management

Studios 
 Recorded at Swamp Rat Studios (Boca Raton, FL); Sapphire Sound (Las Vegas, NV); The Barn (Shadow Hills, CA).
 Mixed at Sapphire Sound
 Mastered at The Mastering Lab (Hollywood, CA).

The Rippingtons albums
2003 albums